Michael F. Greene (January 1, 1884 – October 20, 1951) was an Irish-born American labor union leader.

Born in County Clare in Ireland, Greene emigrated to the United States in 1887, settling in Connecticut.  He left school at the age of 13, and later completed an apprenticeship as a hatter, in Danbury, Connecticut.  He joined the United Hatters of North America in 1904 and, after working in various locations, returned to Danbury and held various leadership positions in his union local.

In 1918, Greene was elected as president of the United Hatters.  In 1925, he served as the American Federation of Labor's delegate to the British Trades Union Congress, and was also a U.S. delegate to the labor council of the League of Nations, in Bern.

In 1934, Greene organized a merger which formed the United Hatters, Cap, and Millinery Workers International Union.  He served as its president until 1936, and then as secretary-treasurer until 1949.

References

1884 births
1951 deaths
American trade union leaders
Irish emigrants to the United States (before 1923)
People from County Clare